Apno Nepal Apno Gaurab is a weekly Marwari Television show (2011–Present) with the objective to get people to know about marwari culture, language, cuisine, talk shows with people from different professions. The show is anchored/produced by Dayaram Agrawal. This show comes every Saturday on Himalaya Television (A private Television Channel of Nepal). Celebrities like Sanjeev Kapoor, Kiran Bedi, Sri Sri Sri Ravishankar, Binod Chaudhary, Anupam Kher etc. have been interviewed in this show. It is the only Marwari show being run in Nepal. This program is quite famous in Nepal, especially among Marwaris.

History

Nepalese television shows
2011 Nepalese television series debuts